Laawaris is a 1981 Indian masala film directed by Prakash Mehra. The film became known for its song "Mere Angene Mein Tumhara Kya Kaam Hai" (roughly translated as: "In my courtyard, what is your purpose?") rendered twice: the first time by a young Alka Yagnik, who earned her first Filmfare nomination as best female playback singer, and the second time by Amitabh Bachchan. The second version became very popular due to Bachchan's comedic performance in drag. The lyrics pay tribute to every type of wife, be they fat, tall, short, dark, or fair skinned. Even today, the song is popular among audiences.

Laawaris starred Amitabh Bachchan, Zeenat Aman, Amjad Khan in lead roles. In Hindi, "Laawaris" loosely means bastard or orphan. Although the word still has negative connotations, they are not as extreme as in English. The story revolves around an orphan who stumbles over reality in search for his parents.

The film was declared "super-hit" at box-office according to Box Office India. It was the fourth-highest grossing Bollywood film of 1981. It earned additional Filmfare nominations for Best Actor (Amitabh Bachchan) and Best Supporting Actor (Suresh Oberoi).

Plot 

Vidya (Raakhee) is a famous singer and she is in love with Ranvir Singh (Amjad Khan), a leading business man. She gets pregnant with his child but Ranvir Singh wants it to be aborted. Vidya who doesn't want to abort her child decides to break up with Ranvir Singh and she leaves with her brother without informing Ranvir Singh. Vidya dies while giving birth to a baby boy but her brother takes away the baby and gives it to his driver, Gangu Ganpat, asking it to be killed. Meanwhile, Gangu Ganpat, a drunkard decides to raise the baby on his own instead of killing with the intention of making some money with the help of baby. He names the baby as Heera. Many years later, when a grown up Heera (Amitabh Bachchan) refuses to give Gangu liquor, an angry Gangu reveals his status as an orphan and an angry Heera leaves him.

Heera gets a job in a factory which is owned by Mahendar Singh (Ranjeet), who happens to be the son of Ranvir Singh (with his legally wedded wife and half-brother of Heera) . It is shown that Ranvir Singh leads an unhappy life with his wife in an estate. He feels guilty about his betrayal to Vidya thinking she is dead.

Once employed at Mahendar Singh's factory, Heera understands that workers are not paid properly in Mahendar Singh's factory and decides to fight against it which angers Mahendar Singh. Mohini (Zeenat Aman) the daughter of Kailashnath, falls in love with Heera without knowing his true identity. Mahendar Singh transfers Heera to work in his estate present at a hill station with plans of killing him. Heera meets Ranvir Singh in the estate and gets into his good books. During a function, Mahendar Singh plans to kill Heera, but accidentally Ranvir Singh gets hurt. In the climax Ranvir Singh accepts Heera as his legitimate son and unites with his whole family.

Cast 
Amitabh Bachchan as Heera
Zeenat Aman as Mohini
Ranjeet as Mahendra Singh
Bindu as Kamini Singh
Amjad Khan as Ranveer Singh
Jeevan as Lala
Om Prakash as Dr. Goel
Satyen Kappu as Kailaash
Mukri as Gafoor
Shreeram Lagoo as Gangu Ganpat
Ram Sethi as Harnava
Suresh Oberoi as Ram Singh
Preeti Sapru as Chanchal
Yunus Parvez as Mukadam
Viju Khote as Factory Supervisor
Goga Kapoor as Hired Goon
Raakhee as Vidya (Special Appearance)

Soundtrack
The music of this movie was composed by Kalyanji–Anandji, while the lyrics were written by Anjaan and Prakash Mehra. The movie features some popular songs like "Apni Toh Jaise Taise" sung by Kishore Kumar and "Mere Angne Mein", whose male version was sung by Amitabh Bachchan. The song "Mere Angne Mein" was recreated by Tanishk Bagchi in the year 2020 in the voice of Neha Kakkar and Raja Hassan. The song "Apni Toh Jaise Taise" was recreated by Shankar–Ehsaan–Loy in the voice of Mika Singh and Sunidhi Chauhan in the 2010 film Housefull. Both the music videos starred Sri Lankan actress Jacqueline Fernandez.

Remakes

Laawaris was remade as

Naa Desam, in Telugu in 1982, starring NTR, Kaikala Satyanarayana and Jayasudha.
Panakkaran, in Tamil in 1990, starring Rajinikanth, Vijayakumar and Gautami.

Both films were massive hits in their respective languages.

Awards and nominations

References

External links 
 
 https://web.archive.org/web/20131014090332/http://www.boxofficeindia.com/showProd.php?itemCat=125&catName=MTk4MC0xOTg5

1980s Hindi-language films
1980s masala films
1981 films
Films about orphans
Films directed by Prakash Mehra
Films scored by Kalyanji Anandji
Hindi films remade in other languages